This is a list of artists who work primarily in the medium of interactive art.

B 
 Artur Barrio
 Maurice Benayoun
 Timothy Binkley
 Maurizio Bolognini
 Geoff Bunn

C 
 Peter Campus
 Janet Cardiff
 Thomas Charvériat
 Marcelo Coelho
 Shane Cooper

D 
 Char Davies
 Liu Dao (artist collective)
 Mark Divo
 Juan Downey

E 
 Ernest Edmonds

F 
 Ken Feingold
 Alicia Framis
 Masaki Fujihata

H 
 Heather Hart
 Jeppe Hein
 Desmond Paul Henry
 Lynn Hershman
 Hugo Heyrman
 Perry Hoberman

I 
 Toshio Iwai

J 
 Christopher Janney
 Miranda July

K 
 Eduardo Kac
 Sep Kamvar
 Knowbotic Research
 Meeli Kõiva
 Myron Krueger
 Aki Kuroda
 Ryota Kuwakubo

L 
 Marc Lee
 Golan Levin
 Jen Lewin
 LIA
 Zachary Lieberman
 Liu Dao
 Marita Liulia
 Rafael Lozano-Hemmer

M 
 Ali Miharbi
 George Bures Miller

N 
 Michael Naimark
 Mark Napier
 Graham Nicholls

P 
 Jim Pallas
 Simon Penny
 Liz Phillips
 Pors

R 
 Ken Rinaldo
 Don Ritter (artist)
 Miroslaw Rogala
 David Rokeby
 Daan Roosegaarde
 Daniel Rozin

S 
 Tomás Saraceno
 Tino Sehgal
 Jeffrey Shaw
 Nathaniel Stern
 Scott Snibbe

T 
 Marc Tasman
 Rirkrit Tiravanija
 Timo Toots

U 
 Camille Utterback

V 
 Angelo Vermeulen

W 
 Theo Watson

Z 
 Ricardo Miranda Zuñiga

See also
Interactive Art
Interactive Media

References

 Bullivant, Lucy (2006). Responsive Environments: architecture, art and design (V&A Contemporaries). London:Victoria and Albert Museum. 
 Bullivant, Lucy (2005). 4dspace: Interactive Architecture (Architectural Design). London: John Wiley & Sons. 
 Christiane Paul (2003). Digital Art (World of Art series). London: Thames & Hudson. 
 Wands, Bruce Art of the Digital Age, Thames and Hudson 2006, pp. 89, 139,  | 
 Weibel, Peter and Shaw, Jeffrey, Future Cinema, MIT Press 2003, pp. 472,572-581, 
 Wilson, Steve Information Arts: Intersections of Art, Science, and Technology 

 
Interactive artists, List of
New media
New media art